Souaghi District is a district of Médéa Province, Algeria.

The district is further divided into 4 municipalities:
Souagui
Djouab
Sidi Zahar
Sidi Ziane

Districts of Médéa Province
hi